Neoclytus approximatus is a species of beetle in the family Cerambycidae. It was described by John Lawrence LeConte in 1862.

References

Neoclytus
Beetles described in 1862